Long Lake, Ontario, may refer to:

Long Lake, Thunder Bay District, Ontario
Long Lake, Frontenac County, Ontario
Long Lake (Ontario) (Lake)